Edward Stanhope (1840–1893) was a British politician.

Edward Stanhope may also refer to:

Edward Stanhope (died 1603), MP for Nottinghamshire (UK Parliament constituency) and Yorkshire
Edward Stanhope (died 1608), MP for Marlborough
Edward Stanhope (died 1646), MP for Scarborough (UK Parliament constituency)

See also
Edward Scudamore-Stanhope, 12th Earl of Chesterfield, English nobleman